Güzle can refer to:

 Güzle, Korkuteli
 Güzle, Refahiye